Nerello is a name given to two varieties of red wine grapes that are grown primarily in Sicily and Sardinia.
Nerello Mascalese, which is named after the Mascali area in Catania where the grape is thought to have originated. It is grown mainly on the northeastern side of Sicily and is thought to be superior in quality to the Nerello Cappuccio. While it can be used for blending, the grape is often made into varietal wine. The grape is believed to be an offspring of the Calabrian wine grape Mantonico bianco.
Nerello Cappuccio It is widely used in the Etna DOC as a blending grape that adds color and alcohol to the wine. It is one of the three grapes used to make the wine Corvo Rosso.

An Italian study published in 2008 using DNA typing showed a close genetic relationship between Sangiovese on the one hand and ten other Italian grape varieties on the other hand, including Nerello. It is therefore likely that Nerello is a crossing of Sangiovese and another, so far unidentified, grape variety.

The organoleptic characteristics of the monovarietal Nerello Mascalese generally are a ruby red color, with subtle grenade tones; a strong fruity scent of red berry fruits, with slight floral shades, a spicy hint, and a delicate effusion of vanilla and tobacco, with a persistent trace of licorice; and a dry, tannic, persistent and harmonic taste, with a strong body. At sight, the wine seems surely more mature than it appears when smelled or tasted. Treating this vine variety in a traditional way, it can produce a wine presenting the above-described characteristics.

Wine styles
Around the city of Messina in northeast Sicily, both Nerellos are sometimes blended with the local red grape Acitana in wines made outside the regulations of the Faro DOC.

References 
Red wine grape varieties
Wine grapes of Italy